Sigurd Olsen Moen (31 October 1897 – 6 October 1967) was a Norwegian speed skater and Olympic medalist. He was born in Krødsherad, and represented the club Drammens SK. He won a bronze medal in 1500m at the 1924 Winter Olympics in Chamonix.

References

External links

1897 births
1967 deaths
Norwegian male speed skaters
Olympic speed skaters of Norway
Speed skaters at the 1924 Winter Olympics
Olympic bronze medalists for Norway
Olympic medalists in speed skating
Medalists at the 1924 Winter Olympics
People from Krødsherad
Sportspeople from Viken (county)